Buena was a station on the Chicago Transit Authority's Howard Line, which is now part of the Red Line. The station was located at the corner of Buena and Kenmore Avenues in the Uptown neighborhood of Chicago. Buena was situated north of Sheridan and south of Wilson. Buena opened on May 31, 1900, and closed on August 1, 1949, along with 23 other stations as part of a CTA service revision.

References

Defunct Chicago "L" stations
Railway stations in the United States opened in 1900
Railway stations closed in 1949
1900 establishments in Illinois
1949 disestablishments in Illinois